Shiao Lih-ju (born 1955) is a retired Taiwanese singer and TV presenter who released more than 30 albums in the 1970s and 1980s. She sang in Mandarin, Hokkien, and Japanese.

Shiao rose to fame after singing the theme songs of many popular films based on Chiung Yao's novels, like Fantasies Behind the Pearly Curtain (1975), Everywhere Birds Are Singing (1978), and Love Under a Rosy Sky (1979). She also sang the theme songs of many TV series, like the Singaporean historical drama The Sword and the Song (1986). In the mid-1980s, she moved to Singapore, and retired after marrying a Singaporean man in 1990.

Awards
1984 Golden Bell Awards
Won—Best Female Singer

References

Taiwanese Mandopop singers
Taiwanese Hokkien pop singers
Japanese-language singers of Taiwan
Chinese Culture University alumni
1955 births
Living people
People from Chiayi
J-pop singers
20th-century Taiwanese women singers
Taiwanese women television presenters